Vasks may refer to:

Pēteris Vasks (born 1946), Latvian composer
16513 Vasks, main-belt asteroid